Itabirito is a municipality in the Minas Gerais state of Brazil. Its population is estimated to have 52,446 people in 2020. The city belongs to the mesoregion Metropolitan of Belo Horizonte and to the microregion of Ouro Preto.

The municipality contains 10% of the  Serra do Gandarela National Park, created in 2014.

Famous Citizens of Itabirito

Telê Santana (1931-2006), soccer coach of the Brazilian professional team during the 1982 World Cup and 1986 World Cup editions. He is regarded as one of the greatest innovators in the history of Brazilian soccer.

Itabirito on the Map

Satellite image of Itabirito (Google Earth) http://maps.google.ca/maps?f=q&hl=en&geocode=&q=Itabirito&sll=-19.147763,-41.726074&sspn=1.849915,2.570801&ie=UTF8&t=h&z=11&om=1

Mayors of Itabirito 
José Theodoro Alves Júnior (1923-1930)

Alberto Woods Soares (1930-1936)

Antônio Marques Costa (1936-1942)

José Raimundo Soares Silva (1943-1946)

José Raimundo Soares Silva (1948-1950)

Flávio Alves Ferreira Bastos (1951-1954)

Gastão Melillo (1953-1966)

José Galo (1955-1958)

Antônio Gomes Batista (1959-1962)

Celso Matos Silva (1967)

Celso Matos Silva (1970)

José Bastos Bittencourt (1973-1976)

Waldir Salvador de Oliveira (1971)

Gastão Melillo (1972)

Celso Matos Silva (1977-1982)

Celso Matos Silva (1982)

Gastão Melillo (1983-1988)

Waldir Silva Salvador de Oliveira Júnior (1989-1992)

Geraldo Mendanha de Almeida (1993-1996)

Manoel da Mota Neto (1997-2000)

Manoel da Mota Neto (2001-2004)

Waldir Silva Salvador de Oliveira Júnior (2005-2008)

Alex Salvador de Oliveira (2009)

Manoel da Mota Neto (2010-2012)

Alex Salvador de Oliveira (20013-2016)

Alex Salvador de Oliveira (20017-2019)

Orlando Amorim Caldeira (2019-2020)

References

Municipalities in Minas Gerais